, is a Japanese musician, who began releasing Vocaloid music under the name  in 2009. After self-releasing Vocaloid music and self-cover extended plays using his own voice, he debuted under independent label Balloom using the name Fullkawa Honpo in 2011.

Biography 

Fullkawa Honpo is from Osaka Prefecture, Japan. When he was 14, he joined his first band, a Visual-kei band specialising in metal. He joined a guitar rock group at university, and after finishing university decided to continue to be a musician, having difficulties finding other types of work. He continued with that band, and the group moved to Tokyo for their CD debut. However, when Fullkawa Honpo was in his mid 20s, the band split before they managed to debut, and he remained in Tokyo to work as a designer. Frustrated with the band, he began working as a Vocaloid producer, and started uploading songs to Nico Nico Douga in June 2009. He took his Vocaloid moniker Fullkawa-P from a local carpark business called , thinking that something ending in "P" would be suitable, in the style of many other Vocaloid producers.

Fullkawa Honpo continued to release Vocaloid songs in 2009 and 2010, with his songs "Piano Lesson," "Mugs" and "Alice" all receiving over 100,000 views ("Alice" receiving over 400,000), as well as self-releasing Vocaloid music on CD, beginning with the Piano Lesson EP in September 2009. In March 2011, Fullkawa Honpo and seven other musicians created Balloom, an independent music label for Internet musicians to widen their musical opportunities. His debut album Alice in Wonderword was released two months later, and featured mostly re-recordings of his Vocaloid songs, collaborating with vocalists such as Kahimi Karie and Maki Nomiya. Fullkawa Honpo was nominated for the best Indies Artist at the Billboard Japan Awards in 2011.

In 2012, Fullkawa Honpo moved to Space Shower Music, and released his second album Girlfriend from Kyoto on November 7, 2012. His third album Soup was released on November 6, 2013. After releasing his fourth album in October 2014, Hail Against the Barn Door, Fullkawa Honpo was unsure what he wanted to do next musically, and decided to stop releasing music as Fullkawa Honpo at the end of 2015.

In 2020, after a five-year absence, he announced the continuation of new releases under the Fullkawa Honpo name, along with a new label, DONAI paris. His first new single since then released February 2021.

Discography

Studio albums

Compilation album

Live album

Extended plays

Vocaloid extended plays

Vocaloid songs

Video album

Notes

References

External links 

 

Official blog

1980 births
Japanese male musicians
Japanese male singer-songwriters
Japanese singer-songwriters
Living people
Musicians from Osaka Prefecture
Vocaloid musicians
21st-century Japanese singers
21st-century Japanese male singers